Pasquale Pozzessere (born in 1957) is an Italian film director and screenwriter.

Life and career 
Born in Lizzano, Taranto in the mid-1980s Pozzessere abandoned his medicine university studies to enter the cinema industry working as a script supervisor for Pupi Avati and as assistant director of Francesco Maselli. After directing a number of short films, he made his feature film debut in 1992, with Verso Sud, for which he was nominated to  a David di Donatello for Best New Director  and won the Grolla d'oro in the same category. The film also won the Grand Prix at the Annecy Film Festival.

Filmography 
 
Verso Sud (1992) 
Father and Son (1994) 
An Eyewitness Account (1997) 
La vita che verrà (TV, 1999)
La porta delle sette stelle (2005) 
La provinciale (TV, 2006)
Cocapop (2010)
Mine (2016)

References

External links 
 

1957 births
Italian film directors
Italian screenwriters
Italian male screenwriters
People from the Province of Taranto 
Living people
Ciak d'oro winners